VARO Energy (VARO) is an energy company headquartered in Zug, Switzerland. It operates in manufacturing, storage and distribution, marketing and trading, with businesses in biofuels, green hydrogen, biomethane & bio-LNG, nature-based carbon removals and e-mobility. The company is focused on the Benelux countries, Germany, France and Switzerland. VARO Energy’s shareholders include the global Investment firm, Carlyle and the global energy and commodities company, Vitol. The company CEO is Dev Sanyal.

VARO owns a manufacturing hub in Cressier, Switzerland, a majority share in the Bayernoil manufacturing hub, Southern Germany, as well as storage facilities, distribution and marketing businesses in Benelux, France, Germany and Switzerland. The company also owns a 51% stake in SilviCarbon, a global leader in nature-based Carbon Dioxide Removals (CDRs) and 49.5% share in E-Flux, a leading provider of electric vehicle charging software.

History

2012 
VARO Energy was created with an acquisition of the Cressier refinery in Switzerland, from Petroplus, alongside marketing and storage activities.

It was established as a joint venture between the commodity trader Vitol (75%) and Atlas Invest (25%), a financial holding company owned by the leading energy investor, Marcel van Poecke, who remains the Chairman of VARO Energy.

2013 
VARO Energy’ shareholder base was restructured; in place of Atlas Invest, the financial investor Carlyle takes a 50 percent stake

In Germany, VARO acquired Petrotank and Vitol Marketing Germany.

2014 
VARO became the owner of 45% of the Bayernoil refinery in Germany through the acquisition of shares held by OMV Deutschland GmbH in Bayernoil Raffineriegesellschaft GmbH and other downstream assets owned by OMV Deutschland GmbH.

The company acquired Total’s heating oil business and general trade business in Switzerland (Huiles Minérales, Mazol, Portales & Bonnet CH). The purchased assets include tank storage facilities in Eclépens near Lausanne and Total’s entire end customer distribution and sales network for domestic heating oil and diesel in Switzerland.

Roger Brown is appointed Chief Executive Officer of VARO.

2015 
VARO invested over 50 million Swiss Francs in the Cressier refinery, the most significant investment in the site’s history, allowing it to remain competitive in the long term. The investment is focused on safety, asset integrity and growth, with projects including a partial conversion of the refinery’s energy sourcing to natural gas, a cleaner source of energy, and technical upgrades to allow for the production of gasoline containing up to 5% ethanol produced from renewable sources.

VARO acquired the German wholesale distributors Marol and Gekol.

VARO merged with Dutch-based company Argos leading to gaining full ownership of Rhytank AG, located in Switzerland. Reggeborgh, a private Dutch investment company, enters as a third shareholder with 1/3 participation each.

The company purchased bunkering activities from Vitol in Germany.

2016 
The company took full control over two tank storage terminals in the Netherlands: Hydrocarbon Hotel and Enviem Terminal.

VARO expanded its inland bunkering activities by acquiring Fiwado B.V. in the Netherlands.

2017 
VARO acquired 100% of shares of Inter Oil B.V., a holding company, expanding retail activities in the Netherlands by gaining the brand names Brand Oil and Amigo.

The company acquired the assets of Schneider Mineralöl Meissen GmbH. (retail and direct sales) in Saxony.

VARO expanded its retail network in the Netherlands with the purchase of United Fuel Group B.V. gaining additional fuel stations.

Hydrocarbon Hotel Tankstorage Terminal, purchased in 2016, is sold to Global Petro Storage.

The former Petrotank terminal situated in Hanau in Germany is sold to Adolf Roth GmbH & Co. KG.

2018 
VARO purchased Van den Belt gaining several fuel stations in the process.

VARO acquired Gerber Energie GmbH & retail sites from Wengel & Dettelbacher, and the terminal in Brugges, Belgium.

2019 
VARO acquired 100% of the shares in SMD Beheer BV, a Calpam-group company, adding 19 Calpam branded stations to its Dutch retail network.

2020 
VARO added an additional 6.4% to its stake in Bayernoil, making the company the majority stakeholder with 51.4%.

2021 
Carlyle completes an acquisition of the stake in VARO to hold 66.66% of shares in the company.

VARO completed the purchase of 51% of shares in SilviCarbon.

As of October 1, VARO gains a 49.5% share in E-Flux.

2022 
Dev Sanyal is appointed Chief Executive Officer of VARO Energy.

VARO and Group E announced the plan to build the most powerful ground-mounted solar facility in Switzerland, in Cressier.

VARO Energy & GPS Group announced the completion of an integrated biofuels facility in the port of Amsterdam.

VARO announced a new strategy to invest 3.5 billion and help customers meet net zero.

Sustainability 
In July 2022 VARO announced a sector leading commitment to be Net Zero by 2040 as a key part of its strategy to become the energy transition partner of choice. According to its twin-engine strategy, VARO’s five strategic growth pillars are: Advanced Biofuels; Biomethane & Bio-LNG; Green Hydrogen; E-mobility; Nature-based Carbon Removals.

References 

2012 establishments